Sly Park (formerly, Park) is an unincorporated community in El Dorado County, California.

A post office operated at Sly Park from 1891 to 1919, with several moves. The name honors James Sly, one of the Mormons who discovered Sly Valley.

References

Unincorporated communities in California
Unincorporated communities in El Dorado County, California